Mirror, Mirror III: The Voyeur is a 1995 American erotic horror film directed by Rachel Gordon and Virginia Perfili, and starring Billy Drago, David Naughton, Monique Parent, and Mark Ruffalo.

The film was released directly-to-video in 1995. Ruffalo, who appeared in the previous installment, Mirror, Mirror II: Raven Dance, appears in an unrelated role in the film.

Cast
Billy Drago as Anthony
David Naughton as Detective Kobeck
Monique Parent as Cassandra
Mark Ruffalo as Joey
Richard Cansino as Julio
Elizabeth Baldwin as Carolyn
Rudolf Weber as Ramon

Release
Anchor Bay Entertainment released Mirror, Mirror III: The Voyeur on DVD on October 24, 2000. On March 9, 2004, Anchor Bay re-released the film on DVD as part of a four-film set featuring all of the films in the Mirror, Mirror series.

Critical response
TV Guide awarded the film one out of four stars, noting: "The only surprise to be had in Mirror, Mirror III is that it took two credited directors to pilot this melange of listless acting, perfunctory horror elements, lengthy but ineffective sex scenes, and amateurish action set pieces."

References

External links

1996 horror films
1996 films
American erotic horror films
American sequel films
Direct-to-video erotic thriller films
1990s English-language films
1990s American films